Michaela Conlin (born June 9, 1978) is an American actress. She is best known for her role as Angela Montenegro on the Fox crime procedural comedy-drama Bones which she played from 2005 to 2017. She is also known for her recurring roles in the Paramount series Yellowstone (2018-2019), and the Apple TV+ series For All Mankind (2021).

Early life and education
Conlin was born in Allentown, Pennsylvania on June 9, 1978 to a Chinese mother, an accountant, and an Irish father, a contractor. She performed in her first play at the age of seven, and continued to appear on stage in numerous Pennsylvania community and regional productions.

Conlin attended Parkland High School in South Whitehall Township, Pennsylvania, where she starred in productions of Bye Bye Birdie and The Crucible. After graduating from high school in 1996, she moved to New York City to study acting and was accepted to New York University Tisch School of the Arts. While working toward her Bachelor of Fine Arts in Theater, she appeared in several productions at the Atlantic Theater Company, the Playwrights Horizons Theater School, Stonestreet Studios Conservatory, and she traveled to Amsterdam to study with the Experimental Theatre Wing's International Training Program.

Career

Television

Following her graduation from New York University, Conlin was selected to be part of the cable documentary series The It Factor, which focused on the lives of young actors in New York City. Soon after, she relocated to Los Angeles, where she landed her first starring role in the ABC drama series MDs, playing an idealistic young intern taken under the wing of the hospital's two renegade doctors, played by William Fichtner and John Hannah. She followed that with a leading role in the ABC drama series The D.A., playing an outspoken political consultant to Steven Weber's district attorney.

Conlin played Angela Montenegro on the popular Fox drama Bones, which stars Emily Deschanel and David Boreanaz. In the series, Angela is married to Dr. Jack Hodgins (T. J. Thyne), while her father is ZZ Top's Billy Gibbons, who plays a fictionalized version of himself. Angela's full name is Angela "Pookie Noodlin" Pearly Gates Montenegro, with Pearly Gates also being the name of Gibbons' Les Paul guitar. In 2008, Conlin was nominated for an Asian Excellence Award in the category of Supporting Television actress for her role on Bones.

In 2023, she started doing TV ads for Hormel’s SPAM products.

Films
Conlin portrayed Detective Heidi Sobel in the 2011 drama film The Lincoln Lawyer. She also appeared in Open Window and Love the Hard Way. In 2021, she portrayed Maria Li in Bad Trip.

Personal life
Conlin is married and has two sons, Charlie and Theodore.

Conlin is best friends with Bones co-star Emily Deschanel, who played her best friend Temperance "Bones" Brennan on the show.

Filmography

Film

Television

References

External links 

1978 births
Living people
Actresses from Allentown, Pennsylvania
Actresses from Los Angeles
American actresses of Chinese descent
American film actresses
American people of Irish descent
American stage actresses
American television actresses
Parkland High School (Pennsylvania) alumni
Tisch School of the Arts alumni